The Jisr ash-Shughur massacre of 1980 occurred in Syria on 9 March 1980, when helicopter borne Syrian troops were sent into Jisr ash-Shugur, a town between Aleppo and Latakia, to quell demonstrators, who had recently ransacked barracks and party offices in town. A ferocious search and destroy mission ensued that left some two hundred dead, while scores of prisoners were ordered executed in field tribunals.

History
Against a background of an Islamist uprising across Syria, inhabitants of Jisr ash-Shugur marched on the local Ba'ath Party headquarters and set it on fire. The police were unable to restore order and fled. Some demonstrators seized weapons and ammunition from a nearby army barracks. Later that day, units of the Syrian Army Special Forces were helicoptered in from Aleppo to regain control, which they did after pounding the town with rockets and mortars, destroying homes and shops and killing and wounding dozens of people. At least two hundred people were arrested. The following day a military tribunal ordered the execution of more than a hundred of the detainees. In all, about 150-200 people were said to have been killed.

See also
List of massacres in Syria
Siege of Jisr al-Shughur
Syrian Civil War

References

Islamist uprising in Syria
Massacres in Syria
1980 in Syria
Conflicts in 1980
Massacres in 1980
Political repression in Syria 
1980 murders in Syria
Massacres committed by Syria